Paul Joseph Braddy (born 20 January 1939) is an Australian state politician.

Early life
He was a solicitor before entering politics and served as an alderman in the Rockhampton City Council for three years from 1979.

Political career
He entered the Queensland Parliament at a by-election for Rockhampton in 1985. Braddy represented Rockhampton until 1995, when he changed to the seat of Kedron, where he remained the sitting member until his retirement. He was, at various times, Minister for Education, Minister for Police and Emergency Services and Minister for Police and Corrective Services in the Goss Labor Government, and Minister for Employment, Training and Industrial Relations under Peter Beattie. He was briefly Deputy Premier of Queensland following the resignation of Jim Elder and the appointment of Terry Mackenroth.

In 1999, Braddy announced his intended resignation from politics after his seat of Kedron was abolished. He said that he did not intend to contest the next state election.

References

	

1939 births
Living people
Deputy Premiers of Queensland
Members of the Queensland Legislative Assembly
Australian solicitors
Australian Labor Party members of the Parliament of Queensland
21st-century Australian politicians